Luis Goicoechea (born 26 November 1956) is a Venezuelan former swimmer. He competed in four events at the 1976 Summer Olympics.

References

1956 births
Living people
Venezuelan male swimmers
Olympic swimmers of Venezuela
Swimmers at the 1976 Summer Olympics
Place of birth missing (living people)
Central American and Caribbean Games gold medalists for Venezuela
Competitors at the 1974 Central American and Caribbean Games
Central American and Caribbean Games medalists in swimming
20th-century Venezuelan people
21st-century Venezuelan people